Siganoidea is a superfamily belonging to the suborder Percoidei which in turn is the largest suborder of the order Perciformes. It contains two families of largely Indo-Pacific distribution.

Taxonomy
Siganoidea is recognised by the 5th edition of the Fishes of the World as a superfamily within the Percoidei.

Families
The two families placed in the Siganoidea are:

 Scatophagidae Gill, 1883
 Siganidae Richardson, 1837

Molecular studies
Molecular analyses suggest that these families are closer to the surgeonfishes than to other Percoidei and place these families in the order Acanthuriformes. Other workers have suggested that the two families are among those stated as incertae sedis with the series Eupercaria.

References

Taxa named by John Richardson (naturalist)
Percoidei